Events in the year 2019 in Cuba.

Incumbents
 First Secretary of the Communist Party of Cuba: Raúl Castro
 Second Secretary of the Communist Party of Cuba: José Ramón Machado Ventura
 President: Miguel Díaz-Canel
 First Vice President: Salvador Valdés Mesa
Prime Minister: Manuel Marrero Cruz

Events

January 
 January 2 – The 60th anniversary of the Cuban Revolution was celebrated in the capital of Havana.
 January 27 – A rare EF4 tornado makes landfall in Havana, killing at least three and causing severe damage.

February 
 February 24 – The 2019 Cuban constitutional referendum took place.

March 
 March 24–27 – President Díaz-Canel hosted the Charles, Prince of Wales and Camilla, Duchess of Cornwall to the capital as the first members of the British royal family to visit the island.

April 

 April 10 – The new Constitution of Cuba came into force.

December 

 December 21 – Manuel Marrero Cruz assumes office as the 19th Prime Minister of Cuba, becoming the first person to hold the office after the post was reestablished by the 2019 Constitution.

Deaths 

 July 26 – Jaime Lucas Ortega y Alamino, Cuban cardinal (b. 1936)

References

 
Historical events in Cuba
Cuba